The Knockoneil River sometimes spelled Knockoneill and is even called Clady River this river is a small to medium sized river in Northern Ireland located near Maghera and is a major artery river which merges with the Grillagh River to form the Clady River. It flows eastwards towards Swatragh , Knockoneil is a townland in the rural area  of Slaughtneil and is the townland the rivers named after .The Knockoneil starts its course and it is only about 10 to 15 feet wide at this point after this the river widens as it passes through Swatragh and onwards to Upperlands where a lot of hydro energy from the river is used for Clarke's mill. It flows onwards outside Culnady where it widens quite drastically round the old Dunglady Bridge around 20 to 30 feet across it then flows onwards where it merges with the Grillagh river to form the Clady River. Knockoneil River Means Nialls Hill River.

The River is famously known to be the reason William Clark & Sons in Upperlands exists as being the main power source for the Mill. The river is diverted through massive sluice gates downstream from Amportane Bridge this tailrace feeds 5 manmade lakes known locally as The Dams the river was used to power the mill and its electricals as well as the dyeing process this caused dye pollution on the river. The river was similar to the Grillagh being many flax mills were built along the river most well known being Lagans Scutching Mill near Upperlands.

The River is leases by the Clady And District Angling Club funded in 1962.

Bridges 
Tammybrack Bridge Corlacky Hill Bridge Knockoneil Bridge Stranagon Bridge Swatragh Bridge Beagh Bridge Amportane Bridge Upperland Bridge Jubilee Bridge Boyne Bridge Dunglady Bridge.

Tributaries 

Green Water Burn Starts south of Brockaghboy windfarm and flows a few miles and into the Knockoneil

Corlacky Burn Starts on the Corlacky hill and flows into the Knockoneil.

Craigavole Burn The Craigavole burn is the 3rd largest tributary of the Knockoneil river it starts in Craigavole townland and flows east of Swatragh underneath the GAC Swatragh football pitch and rounds a circle east of the town and then straight south and flows into the Knockoneil north of Beagh Bridge.

References
http://www.wmclark.co.uk/
https://www.yumpu.com/en/document/view/50861608/upperlands-institute-of-environmental-management-and-assessment
https://apps.spatialni.gov.uk/PRONIApplication/
https://visionsofthepastblog.com/2019/12/14/knockoneill-court-tomb-derry-ireland/
https://www.bbc.co.uk/news/uk-northern-ireland-39096665#:~:text=world's%20oldest%20companies.-,William%20Clark%20and%20Sons%2C%20based%20at%20Upperlands%2C%20outside%20Maghera%2C,the%20business%20is%20still%20intact.
http://www.wmclark.co.uk/flax-visitor-centre-grand-opening/
http://www.wmclark.co.uk/progress-perseverance-tale-upperlands-alex/

Rivers of County Londonderry